The 1942 Lakehurst Naval Air Station Blimps football team represented the United States Navy's Lakehurst Naval Air Station (Lakehurst NAS) during the 1942 college football season. The team compiled a 4–4–1 record. The team's head coach was Allen Elward, who served as the head football coach at Purdue prior to the war. 

The team was made up of college and professional football players who were serving in the Navy and stationed at Lakehurst NAS. Key players included: halfback Jack Banta who played for the Washington Redskins in 1941; fullback Paul Spencer of Alabama; Johnny Doolan of Georgetown; end Paul Boroff of NYU; Brud Harper of Princeton; and Francis Vedery of Williams College.

Schedule

References

Lakehurst
Lakehurst Naval Air Station Blimps football
Lakehurst Naval Air Station Blimps football